Orychophragmus  is a genus of plants in the family Brassicaceae found in Asia.

References

Brassicaceae
Brassicaceae genera
Taxa named by Alexander von Bunge